Castle St is the fourth studio album by New Zealand band Six60. The band's second collaboration with American music producer Malay, Castle St debuted at number one on the New Zealand Albums Chart.

Production
The album was co-produced by American music producer Malay, who previously worked on the band's 2019 album Six60.

The album's title comes from the Dunedin Street where the band members lived during university. The band began working on the album in Los Angeles, where they spent six months together. Band vocalist Matiu Walters felt that this time was a period of rejuvenation for the band, where they rediscovered the bonds they had created when originally living together as flatmates.

Release
The album's first single "Before You Leave", inspired by the birth of lead vocalist Matiu Walters's daughter, was released on 19 August 2022. This was followed by "Never Been Tonight" in September 2022, which featured the album track "Nobody Knows" as the single's B-side.

To promote the album, a replica of their Castle Street house was constructed and displayed in Eden Park, Auckland.

The band is undertaking a tour of New Zealand during the summer, entitled Six60 Saturdays, held between October 2022 and March 2023. The band's previous tour was postponed due to the effects of COVID-19 in New Zealand. New Zealand band Supergroove reformed to play as an opening act for the tour's Wellington and Auckland dates. The band also plans to tour Australia with The Castle St World Tour, held in December 2022 and February 2023.

Track listing

Credits and personnel
Trey Campbell – songwriting (8)
Ji Fraser – guitar, songwriting (1–10)
Marlon Gerbes – keyboards, songwriting
David Kutch – mastering engineer
Raul Lopez – engineer, mixer
Chris Mac – bass, songwriting (1–10)
Malay – producer, songwriting
Eli Paewai – drums, songwriting (1–10)
Paul Phamous – songwriting (11)
Matiu Walters – vocals, songwriting
Simon Wilcox – songwriting (1–7, 9–10)
Yelawolf – songwriting (2)

Charts

Weekly charts

Year-end charts

Certifications and sales

Release history

References

2022 albums
Six60 albums
Albums produced by Malay (record producer)